Jeffrey Sanchez, Jr. (born January 21, 1981) is a former professional American football cornerback who played in the National Football League, NFL Europe and Arena Football League.

Early years
Sanchez attended and played high school football at Archbishop Hannan High School in Meraux, Louisiana.

Professional career

Dallas Cowboys
Sanchez was signed as an undrafted free agent by the Dallas Cowboys on July 28, 2003.

References

1981 births
Living people
American football cornerbacks
Amsterdam Admirals players
Dallas Cowboys players
Tampa Bay Storm players
Tulane Green Wave football players
Players of American football from New Orleans